Hainan Medical University (HMU) is a public university in Haikou in the Chinese province of Hainan, that offers degrees in medicine. It was established in 1993 .

History
The current college was created in 1993 with the approval of the central government. In 1951, two private medical colleges were merged to form the Hainan Specialized Medical School. These two colleges were Haiqiang Medical Vocational School (created in 1947) and the Medical College of Hainan University (established in 1948).

Mr. Tseven Soong was its first General Director of the Board, After the founding of the People’s Republic of China in 1949, this school was restructured as the Hainan Medical Vocational School and later became the Medical Department of Hainan University.

In 1993, the college became the Hainan Medical College to reflect its specialization in medicine. In 1994, Hainan Medical College was accredited to offer  bachelor's degrees and in 1996 was accredited for undergraduate education by the Ministry of Education.

In 2000, the College established a new campus on Chengxi Road.

Academic departments 
Basic Medical Science Department
Clinical Medicine Institute
Traditional Chinese Medicine Institute
Laboratory Sciences Department
Preventative Medicine Department
Dental Sciences Department
Nursing Sciences Department
Pharmacy Department
Vocational Educational Institute
International Student Institute
Foreign Language Department
Information Technology Department
Physical Education Department
Department of Humanities and Social Sciences

See also
List of universities and colleges in Hainan
List of universities in China
Higher education in China

References

External links 
Hainan Medical College 
Admission Overseas(English)
 

Universities and colleges in Hainan
Educational institutions established in 1993
Organizations based in Haikou
1993 establishments in China